Compulsory sterilization, also known as forced or coerced sterilization, is a government-mandated program to involuntarily sterilize a specific group of people. Sterilization removes a person's capacity to reproduce, and is usually done through surgical procedures. Several countries implemented sterilization programs in the early 20th century. Although such programs have been made illegal in most countries of the world, instances of forced or coerced sterilizations persist.

Rationalizations for compulsory sterilization have included eugenics, population control, gender discrimination, limiting the spread of HIV, "gender-normalizing" surgeries for intersex people, and ethnic genocide. In some countries, transgender individuals are required to undergo sterilization before gaining legal recognition of their gender, a practice that the United Nations Special Rapporteur on torture and other cruel, inhuman or degrading treatment or punishment has described as a violation of the Yogyakarta Principles.

Affected populations
Governmental family planning programs emerged in the late 19th century and have continued to progress through the 21st century. During this time, feminists began advocating for reproductive choice, but eugenicists and hygienists were advocating for low income and disabled peoples to be sterilized or have their fertility tightly regulated in order to "clean" or "perfect" nations. The second half of the 20th century saw national governments uptake of neo-Malthusian ideology that directly linked population growth to increased (and uncontrollable) poverty, which during the embrace of capitalism, meant that countries were unable to economically develop due to this poverty.

Much of these governmental population control programs were focused on using sterilization as the main avenue to reduce high birth rates, even though public acknowledgement that sterilization made an impact on the population levels of the developing world is still widely lacking. Early population programs of the 20th century were marked as part of the eugenics movement, with Nazi Germany's programs providing the most well-known examples of sterilization of disabled people, paired with encouraging ethnic Germans who fit the "Aryan race" phenotype to rapidly reproduce. In the 1970s, population control programs focused on the "third world" to help curtail over population of poverty areas that were beginning to "develop" (Duden 1992).

As of 2013, 24 countries in Europe required sterilization for legal gender recognition and 16 countries did not provide for any possibility to change legal gender at all, which meant that transgender people could have challenges applying for jobs, opening bank accounts, boarding planes, or may not be able to do these things at all.

On February 1, 2013, "United Nations Special Rapporteur on Torture (SRT) issued a report on abusive practices in health care settings that has important implications for LGBT people and people with intersex conditions" and:In May 2014, the World Health Organization, OHCHR, UN Women, UNAIDS, UNDP, UNFPA and UNICEF issued a joint statement on "Eliminating forced, coercive and otherwise involuntary sterilization". The report references the involuntary sterilization of a number of specific population groups. They include:

 Women, especially in relation to coercive population control policies, and particularly including women living with HIV, indigenous and ethnic minority girls and women. Indigenous and ethnic minority women often face "wrongful stereotyping based on gender, race and ethnicity".
 Funding of mothers on welfare by HEW (Health, Education, and Welfare) covers roughly 90% of cost and doctors are likely to concur with the compulsory sterilization of mothers on welfare. Threats to cease welfare occur when women are hesitant to consent.
 Disabled people, especially those with intellectual disability. Women with intellectual disabilities are "often treated as if they have no control, or should have no control, over their sexual and reproductive choices". Other rationales include menstrual management for "women who have or are perceived to have difficulties coping with or managing menses, or whose health conditions (such as epilepsy) or behaviour are negatively affected by menses." Men with intellectual disabilities are also sterilized, sometimes using the justification that it provides greater sexual freedom.
 Intersex persons, who "are often subjected to cosmetic and other non-medically indicated surgeries performed on their reproductive organs, without their informed consent or that of their parents, and without taking into consideration the views of the children involved", often as a "sex-normalizing" treatment.
 Transgender persons, "as a prerequisite to receiving gender-affirmative treatment and gender-marker changes".

The report recommends a range of guiding principles for medical treatment, including ensuring patient autonomy in decision-making, ensuring non-discrimination, accountability and access to remedies.

As a part of human population planning 
Human population planning is the practice of artificially altering the rate of growth of a human population. Historically, human population planning has been implemented by limiting the population's birth rate, usually by government mandate, and has been undertaken as a response to factors including high or increasing levels of poverty, environmental concerns, religious reasons, and overpopulation. While population planning can involve measures that improve people's lives by giving them greater control of their reproduction, some programs have exposed them to exploitation.

In the 1977 textbook Ecoscience: Population, Resources, Environment, authors Paul and Anne Ehrlich, and John Holdren discuss a variety of means to address human overpopulation, including the possibility of compulsory sterilization. This book received renewed media attention with the appointment of Holdren as Assistant to the President for Science and Technology, Director of the White House Office of Science and Technology Policy, largely from conservative pundits who have published scans of the textbook online. Several forms of compulsory sterilization are mentioned, including the proposal for vasectomies for men with three or more children in India in the 1960s, sterilizing women after the birth of their second or third child, birth control implants as a form of removable, long-term sterilization, a licensing system allotting a certain number of children per woman, economic and quota systems of having a certain number of children, and adding a sterilant to drinking water or food sources, although the authors are clear that no such sterilant exists nor is one in development. The authors state that most of these policies are not in practice, have not been tried, and most will likely "remain unacceptable to most societies."

Holdren stated in his confirmation hearing that he no longer supports the creation of an optimum population by the U.S. government. However, the population control policies suggested in the book are indicative of the concerns about overpopulation, also discussed in The Population Bomb a book written by Paul R. Ehrlich and Anne Ehrlich predicting major societal upheavals due to overpopulation. As this concern about overpopulation gained political, economic, and social currency, attempts to reduce fertility rates, often through compulsory sterilization, were results of this drive to reduce overpopulation. These coercive and abusive population control policies impacted people around the world in different ways, and continue to have social, health, and political consequences, one of which is lasting mistrust in current family planning initiatives by populations who were subjected to coercive policies like forced sterilization. While population control policies have been widely critiqued by women's health movement in the 1980s and 1990s, with the International Conference on Population and Development in 1994 in Cairo initiating a shift from population control to reproductive rights and the contemporary reproductive justice movement. However, new forms of population control policies, including coercive sterilization practices are a global issue and a reproductive rights and justice issue.

By country

International law 
The Istanbul Convention prohibits forced sterilization in most European countries (Article 39).
Widespread or systematic forced sterilization has been recognized as a Crime against Humanity by the Rome Statute of the International Criminal Court in the explanatory memorandum. This memorandum defines the jurisdiction of the International Criminal Court. It does not have universal jurisdiction, with the United States, Russia and China among the countries to exclude themselves. Rebecca Lee wrote in the Berkeley Journal of International Law that, twenty-one Council of Europe member states require proof of sterilization in order to change one's legal sex categorization. Lee wrote that requiring sterilization is a human rights violation and that LGBTQ-specific international treaties may need to be developed in order to protect LGBTQ human rights.

Bangladesh 

Bangladesh has a long-running government-operated civilian sterilization program as a part of its population control policy, which targets mainly poor women and men. The government offers 2,000 Bangladeshi Taka (US$24) for women who are persuaded to undergo tubal ligation and for men who are persuaded to undergo vasectomy. Women are also offered a sari and men are offered a kurta to wear for undergoing sterilization. The referrer, who persuades the woman or man to undergo sterilization gets 300 Bangladeshi Taka (US$3.60).

In 1965, the targeted number of sterilizations per month was 600–1,000 in contrast to the insertion of 25,000 IUDs, which was increased in 1978 to about 50,000 sterilizations per month on average. A 50% rise in the amount paid to men coincided with a doubling of the number of vasectomies between 1980 and 1981.

One study conducted in 1977, when incentives were only equivalent to US$1.10 (at that time), indicated that between 40% and 60% of the men chose vasectomy because of the payment, who otherwise did not have any serious urge to get sterilized.

The "Bangladesh Association for Voluntary Sterilization", alone performed 67,000 tubal ligations and vasectomies in its 25 clinics in 1982. The rate of sterilization increased 25 percent each year.

On 16 December 1982, Bangladesh's military ruler Lieutenant General Hussain Muhammad Ershad launched a two-year mass sterilization program for Bangladeshi women and men. About 3,000 women and men were planned to be sterilized on 16 December 1982 (the opening day). Ershad's government trained 1,200 doctors and 25,000 field workers who must conduct two tubal ligations and two vasectomies each month to earn their salaries. And the government wanted to persuade 1.4 million people, both women and men to undergo sterilization within two years. One population control expert called it 'the largest sterilization program in the world'. By January 1983, 40,000 government field workers were employed in Bangladesh's 65,000 villages to persuade women and men to undergo sterilization and to promote usage of birth-control across the country.

Food subsidies under the group feeding program (VGF) were given to only those women with certificates showing that they had undergone tubal ligation.

In the 1977 study, a one-year follow-up of 585 men sterilized at vasectomy camps in Shibpur and Shalna in rural Bangladesh showed that almost half of the men were dissatisfied with their vasectomies.

58% of the men said their ability to work had decreased in the last year. 2–7% of the men said their sexual performance decreases. 30.6% of the Shibpur and 18.9% of the Shalna men experienced severe pain during the vasectomy. The men also said they had not received all of the incentives they had been promised.

According to another study on 5042 women and 264 men who underwent sterilization, complications such as painful urination, shaking chills, fever for at least two days, frequent urination, bleeding from the incision, sore with pus, stitches or skin breaking open, weakness and dizziness arose after the sterilization.

The person's sex, the sponsor and workload in the sterilization center, and the dose of sedatives administered to women were significantly associated with specific postoperative complaints. Five women died during the study, resulting in a death-to-case rate of 9.9/10,000 tubectomies (tubal ligations); four deaths were due to respiratory arrest caused by overuse of sedatives. The death-to-case rate of 9.9/10,000 tubectomies (tubal ligation) in this study is similar to the 10.0 deaths/10,000 cases estimated on the basis of a 1979 follow-up study in an Indian female sterilization camp. The presence of a complaint before the operation was generally a good predictor of postoperative complaints. Centers performing fewer than 200 procedures were associated with more complaints.

According to another study based on 20 sterilization-attributable deaths in Dacca (now Dhaka) and Rajshahi Divisions in Bangladesh, from 1 January 1979, to 31 March 1980, overall, the sterilization-attributable death-to-case rate was 21.3 deaths/100,000 sterilizations. The death rate for vasectomy was 1.6 times higher than that for tubal ligation. Anesthesia overdosage was the leading cause of death following tubal ligation along with tetanus (24%), where intraperitoneal hemorrhage (14%), and infection other than tetanus (5%) was other leading causes of death.

Two women (10%) died from pulmonary embolism after tubal ligation; one (5%) died from each of the following: anaphylaxis from anti-tetanus serum, heat stroke, small bowel obstruction, and aspiration of vomitus. All seven men died from scrotal infections after vasectomy.

According to a second epidemiologic investigation of deaths attributable to sterilization in Bangladesh, where all deaths resulting from sterilizations performed nationwide between 16 September 1980 and 15 April 1981, were investigated and analyzed, nineteen deaths from tubal ligation were attributed to 153,032 sterilizations (both tubal ligation and vasectomy), for an overall death-to-case rate of 12.4 deaths per 100,000 sterilizations. This rate was lower than that (21.3) for sterilizations performed in Dacca (now Dhaka) and Rajshahi Divisions from 1 January 1979 to 31 March 1980, although this difference was not statistically significant. Anesthesia overdosage, tetanus, and hemorrhage (bleeding) were the leading causes of death.

There are reports that often when a woman had to undergo a gastrointestinal surgery, doctors took this opportunity to sterilize her without her knowledge. According to Bangladesh governmental website "National Emergency Service", the 2000 Bangladeshi Taka (US$24) and the sari/lungi given to the persons undergoing sterilizations are their "compensations". Where Bangladesh government also assures the poor people that it will cover all medical expenses if complications arise after the sterilization.

For the women who are persuaded to have IUD inserted into uterus, the government also offers 150 Bangladeshi Taka (US$1.80) after the procedure and 80+80+80=240 Bangladeshi Taka (0.96+0.96+0.96=2.88 USD) in three followups, where the referrer gets 50 Bangladeshi Taka (US$0.60). And for the women who are persuaded to have etonogestrel birth control implant placed under the skin in upper arm, the government offers 150 Bangladeshi Taka (US$1.80) after the procedure and 70+70+70=210 Bangladeshi Taka (0.84+0.84+0.84=2.52 USD) in three followups, where the referrer gets 60 Bangladeshi Taka (US$0.72).

These civilian sterilization programs are funded by the countries from northern Europe and the United States. World bank is also known to have sponsored these civilian exploitative sterilization programs in Bangladesh. Historically, World Bank is known to have pressured 3rd World governments to implement population control programs.

Bangladesh is the eighth-most populous country in the world, having a population of 163,466,000 , despite being ranked 94th by total area having an area of 147,570 km2. Bangladesh has the highest population density in the world among the countries having at least 10 million people. The capital Dhaka is the 4th most densely populated city in the world, which ranked as the world's 2nd most unlivable city, just behind Damascus, Syria, according to the annual "Liveability Ranking" 2015 by the Economist Intelligence Unit (EIU).

Bangladesh is planning to introduce a sterilization program in its overcrowded Rohingya refugee camps, where nearly a million refugees are fighting for space, after efforts to encourage birth control failed. Since 25 August 2017, more than 600,000 Rohingya Muslims have fled from Rakhine state, Myanmar to neighboring Bangladesh, which is a Muslim majority country, following a military crackdown against Rohingya Muslims in Rakhine. Sabura, a Rohingya mother of seven, said her husband believed the couple could support a large family.

"I spoke to my husband about birth control measures. But he is not convinced. He was given two condoms but he did not use them," she said. "My husband said we need more children as we have land and property (in Rakhine). We don't have to worry to feed them."

District family planning authorities have managed to distribute just 549 packets of condoms among the refugees, amid reports they are reluctant to use them. They have asked the government to approve a plan to provide vasectomies for men and tubectomies (tubal ligation) for women in the camps.

One volunteer, Farhana Sultana, said the women she spoke to believed birth control was a sin and others saw it as against the tenets of Islam.

Bangladeshi officials say about 20,000 Rohingya refugee women are pregnant and 600 have given birth since arriving in the country, but this may not be accurate as many births take place without formal medical help.

Every month 250 Bangladeshi people undergo sterilization routinely under the government's sterilization program in the border district of Cox's Bazar, where the Rohingya refugee Muslims have taken shelter.

Brazil 
During the 1970s–80s, the U.S. government sponsored family planning campaigns in Brazil, although sterilization was illegal at the time there. Dalsgaard examined sterilization practices in Brazil; analyzing the choices of women who opt for this type of reproductive healthcare in order to prevent future pregnancies and so they can accurately plan their families. While many women choose this form of contraception, there are many societal factors that impact this decision, such as poor economic circumstances, low rates of employment, and Catholic religious mandates that stipulate sterilization as less harmful than abortion.

An important case in the legal history of compulsory sterilization in Brazil is the 2018 Sáo Paulo case. Prosecutors filed to have a mother of eight forcibly sterilized after she was arrested on charges of drug trafficking. This motion was justified by the mother's poverty, substance abuse disorder, and inability to care for her children, and the judge ruled in favor of sterilization. The surgery was carried out, reportedly against the woman's will. Legal experts discussing the case have stated the sterilization of a woman in Brazil is legal when determined absolutely necessary, but it is not clear what qualifies as necessary.

Canada 

Two Canadian provinces (Alberta and British Columbia) performed compulsory sterilization programs in the 20th century with eugenic aims. Canadian compulsory sterilization operated via the same overall mechanisms of institutionalization, judgment, and surgery as the American system. However, one notable difference is in the treatment of non-insane criminals. Canadian legislation never allowed for punitive sterilization of inmates.

The Sexual Sterilization Act of Alberta was enacted in 1928 and repealed in 1972. In 1995, Leilani Muir sued the Province of Alberta for forcing her to be sterilized against her will and without her permission in 1959. Since Muir's case, the Alberta government has apologized for the forced sterilization of over 2,800 people. Nearly 850 Albertans who were sterilized under the Sexual Sterilization Act were awarded C$142 million in damages.

In the 20th century, the eugenics movement grew in Canada, using forced sterilization as a method to control indigenous populations, alongside the Indian Act of 1876. Non-native physicians worked in the health system created for the native population and were encouraged to carry out sterilizations as a form of family planning. From the 1960s to the 1980s, aboriginal birth rate fell from 47% to 28%, and sterilization laws began to be repealed in the late 1970s. However, Indigenous women have come forward to report instances of coerced sterilization into 2018. Attorney Alisa Lombard has led several lawsuits on behalf of these Indigenous women with the support of the International Justice Resource Center (IJRC). The IJRC has noted the extent of the modern-day sterilization is unknown due to the lack of extensive investigation. After the Canadian government was publicly questioned by the UN regarding its involvement, it pledged to share any documentation of these events in its possession.

China

In 1978, Chinese authorities became concerned with the possibility of a baby boom that the country could not handle, and they initialized the one-child policy. In order to effectively deal with the complex issues surrounding childbirth, the Chinese government placed great emphasis on family planning. Because this was such an important matter, the government thought it needed to be standardized, and so to this end laws were introduced in 2002. These laws uphold the basic tenets of what was previously put into practice, outlining the rights of the individuals and outlining what the Chinese government can and cannot do to enforce policy.

However, accusations have been raised from groups such as Amnesty International, who have claimed that practices of compulsory sterilization have been occurring for people who have already reached their one child quota. These practices run contrary to the stated principles of the law, and seem to differ on a local level.

The Chinese government appears to be aware of these discrepancies in policy implementation on a local level. For example, The National Population and Family Planning Commission put forth in a statement that, "Some persons concerned in a few counties and townships of Linyi did commit practices that violated law and infringed upon legitimate rights and interests of citizens while conducting family planning work." This statement comes in reference to some charges of forced sterilization and abortions in Linyi city of Shandong Province.

The policy requires a "social compensation fee" for those who have more than the legal number of children. According to Forbes editor Heng Shao, critics claims this fee is a toll on the poor but not the rich. But after 2016, the country has allowed parents to give birth to two children. In 2017, the government offered to surgically remove the IUDs that had been implanted in women to force them to adhere to the one child policy, if they qualified to have a second child. The removal of these long used IUDs is a major surgery and many women are not informed of the risks that are associated with the surgery, such as bleeding, infection, and removal of the uterus.

Xinjiang 
Beginning in 2019, reports of forced sterilization in Xinjiang began to surface. In 2020, public reporting continued to indicate that large-scale compulsory sterilization was being carried out as part of the ongoing Uyghur genocide. While national sterilization rates have fallen since the passing of the two child policy in 2016, there has been a sharp increase in the amount of sterilizations in Xinjiang. Many of these surgeries have been forced according to reports, but this is difficult to confirm due to the closed off nature of the area.

Czechoslovakia and the Czech Republic
Czechoslovakia carried out a policy to sterilize some Romani women, starting in 1973. In some cases the sterilization was in exchange for social welfare benefits, and those affected were given written agreements describing what was to be done to them which they were unable to read due to illiteracy. The dissidents of the Charter 77 movement denounced these practices in 1977–78 as a genocide, but they continued through the Velvet Revolution of 1989. A 2005 report by the Czech government's independent ombudsman, Otakar Motejl, identified dozens of cases of coercive sterilization between 1979 and 2001, and called for criminal investigations and possible prosecution against several health care workers and administrators, re Law on Atrocities relevant pre-1990, CR (ChR).

Colombia 
The time period of 1964–1970 started Colombia's population policy development, including the foundation of PROFAMILIA and through the Ministry of Health the family planning program promoted the use of IUDs, the Pill, and sterilization as the main avenues for contraception. By 2005, Colombia had one of the world's highest contraceptive usage rates at 76.9%, with female sterilization being the highest percentage of use at just over 30% (second highest is the IUD at around 12% and the pill around 10%) (Measham and Lopez-Escobar 2007). In Colombia during the 1980s, sterilization was the second most popular choice of pregnancy prevention (after the Pill), and public healthcare organizations and funders (USAID, AVSC, IPPF) supported sterilization as a way to decrease abortions rates. While not directly forced into sterilization, women of lower socio-economic standing had significantly less options to afford family planning care as sterilizations were subsidized.

Denmark
Denmark had a program of "forced sterilization of 60,000 people in 1935-76" which "mainly was directed at people who were mentally handicapped" because of the popularity of eugenics at the time in Denmark. During the 1960s and 1970s, thousands of Greenlandic Inuit women and girls had IUDs placed without their consent. The birth rate in Greenland was reduced by around 50%. In 2022, Denmark and Greenland agreed to hold a two-year investigation into the program, known as the spiral case.

Until June 11, 2014, sterilization was requisite for legal sex change in Denmark.

Germany

One of the first acts by Adolf Hitler after the Reichstag Fire Decree and the Enabling Act of 1933 gave him de facto legal dictatorship over the German state was to pass the Law for the Prevention of Hereditarily Diseased Offspring (Gesetz zur Verhütung erbkranken Nachwuchses) in July 1933. The law was signed by Hitler himself, and over 200 eugenic courts were created specifically as a result of this law. Under it, all doctors in the Third Reich were required to report any patients of theirs who were deemed intellectually disabled, characterized mentally ill (including schizophrenia and manic depression), epileptic, blind, deaf, or physically deformed, and a steep monetary penalty was imposed for any patients who were not properly reported. Individuals with alcoholism or Huntington's disease could also be sterilized. The individual's case was then presented in front of a court of Nazi officials and public health officers who would review their medical records, take testimony from friends and colleagues, and eventually decide whether or not to order a sterilization operation performed on the individual, using force if necessary. Though not explicitly covered by the law, 400 mixed-race "Rhineland Bastards" were also sterilized beginning in 1937. The sterilization program went on until the war started, with about 600,000 people sterilized.

By the end of World War II, over 400,000 individuals were sterilized under the German law and its revisions, most within its first four years of being enacted. When the issue of compulsory sterilization was brought up at the Nuremberg trials after the war, many Nazis defended their actions on the matter by indicating that it was the United States itself from whom they had taken inspiration. The Nazis had many other eugenics-inspired racial policies, including their "euthanasia" programme in which around 70,000 people institutionalized or with birth defects were killed.

Guatemala 
Guatemala is one country that resisted family planning programs, largely due to lack of governmental support, including civil war strife, and strong opposition from both the Catholic Church and Evangelical Christians until 2000, and as such, has the lowest prevalence of contraceptive usage in Latin America. In the 1980s, the archbishop of the country accused USAID of mass sterilizations of women without consent, but a President Reagan backed commission found the allegations to be false.

India 
The Emergency in India from 1975 and 1977 resulted from internal and external conflict for the country, and resulted in misuse of power and human rights violations from the government.  On August 6, 1976, the state of Maharashtra became the first governmental unit to enact legislation mandating compulsory sterilization of men and women after the birth of a third child, passing the Family (Restrictions on Size) Bill on its third reading and sending it to the President of India for the required assent.  The President reacted favorably and sent the bill back to the Maharashtra government with suggested amendments that would be necessary for an enactment, but before the measure could be passed, new elections were called and the legislation was not passed.

Stopping short of forced sterilization, the national government enacted an incentive program for a family planning initiative that began in 1976 in an attempt to lower the exponentially increasing population. This program focused on male citizens and used propaganda and monetary incentives to impoverished citizens to get sterilized. People who agreed to get sterilized would receive land, housing, and money or loans. This program led millions of men to receive vasectomies, and an undetermined amount of these were coerced. There were reports of officials blocking off villages and dragging men to surgical centers for vasectomies. However, after much protest and opposition, the country switched to targeting women through coercion, withholding welfare or ration card benefits, and bribing women with food and money. This switch was theorized to be based on the principle women are less likely to protest for their own rights. Many deaths occurred as a result of both the male and the female sterilization programs. These deaths were likely attributed to poor sanitation standards and quality standards in the Indian sterilization camps.

Sanjay Gandhi, son of the then-Prime Minister Indira Gandhi, was largely responsible for what turned out to be a failed program. A strong mistrust against family planning initiatives followed the highly controversial program, the effect of which continues into the 21st century. Sterilization policies are still enforced in India, targeting mostly indigenous and lower-class women who are herded into the sterilization camps. The most recent abuse of family planning systems was highlighted by the death of 15 lower-class women in a sterilization center in Chhattisgarh in 2014. Despite these deaths, sterilization is still the highest used method of birth control with 39% of women in India turning to sterilization in 2015.

According to Human Rights Law Network:

Japan 

In the first part of the reign of Emperor Hirohito, Japanese governments promoted increasing the number of healthy Japanese, while simultaneously decreasing the number of people deemed to have mental retardation, disability, genetic disease and other conditions that led to inferiority in the Japanese gene pool.

The Leprosy Prevention laws of 1907, 1931, and 1953 permitted the segregation of patients in sanitariums where forced abortions and sterilization were common and authorized punishment of patients "disturbing peace". Under the colonial Korean Leprosy prevention ordinance, Korean patients were also subjected to hard labor.

National Eugenic Law was promulgated in 1940 by the Konoe government, after rejection of the original Race Eugenic Protection Law in 1938. From 1940 to 1945, sterilization was done to 454 Japanese persons under this law. Appx. 25,000 people, including 8,500 under (forced or spontaneous) consent, were surgically processed until 1995.

According to the Eugenic Protection Law (1948), sterilization could be enforced on criminals "with genetic predisposition to commit crime", patients with genetic diseases including mild ones such as total color-blindness, hemophilia, albinism and ichthyosis, and mental affections such as schizophrenia, manic-depression possibly deemed occurrent in their opposition and epilepsy, the sickness of Caesar. The mental sicknesses were added in 1952.

In early 2019, Japan's Supreme Court upheld a requirement that transgender people must have their reproductive organs removed.

In March 2019, Japan's legal policy about transgender people was:As of May 25, 2021, the above law has not been changed.

Kenya
In Kenya, HIV was considered an ongoing issue, and the governor believed that compulsory sterilization of women infected with HIV could stop the spread of the virus. In 2012, a report titled "Robbed of Choice" sparked outrage. The report outlined the experiences of 40 women infected with HIV that had been sterilized against their will. 5 of the 40 women filed a lawsuit against the government of Kenya, claiming violations of their Health and Human Rights. The majority of the women who were sterilized knew nothing about the procedure or its consequences, which was one reason they did not push the issue. The President thought it would be good to keep a list of women who had been infected with HIV, but by naming these women, many of them did not to want to receive medical treatment due to the shame associated with the virus. "The authors concluded that punitive and restrictive laws related to pregnancy have numerous adverse consequences—both health-related and socioeconomic—for women, and urged human rights groups to work with government institutions to protect and fulfill women's fundamental reproductive rights."

Mexico
Civil Society Organizations such as Balance, Promocion para el Desarrollo y Juventud, A.C., have received in the last years numerous testimonies of women living with HIV in which they inform that misinformation about the virus transmission has frequently lead to compulsory sterilization. Although there is enough evidence regarding the effectiveness of interventions aimed to reduce mother-to-child transmission risks, there are records of HIV-positive women forced to undergo sterilization or have agreed to be sterilized without adequate and sufficient information about their options."

A report made in El Salvador, Honduras, Mexico, and Nicaragua concluded that women living with HIV, and whose health providers knew about it at the time of pregnancy, were six times more likely to experience forced or coerced sterilization in those countries. In addition, most of these women reported that health providers told them that living with HIV cancelled their right to choose the number and spacing of the children they want to have as well as the right to choose the contraceptive method of their choice; provided misleading information about the consequences for their health and that of their children and denied them access to treatments that reduce mother-to-child HIV transmission in order to coerce them into sterilization.

This happens even when the health norm NOM 005-SSA2-1993  states that family planning is "the right of everyone to decide freely, responsibly and in an informed way the number and spacing of their children and to obtain specialized information and proper services" and that "the exercise of this right is independent of gender, age, and social or legal status of persons".

Peru

In Peru, President Alberto Fujimori (in office from 1990 to 2000) has been accused of genocide and crimes against humanity as a result of the Programa Nacional de Población, a sterilization program put in place by his administration. During his presidency, Fujimori put in place a program of forced sterilizations against indigenous people (mainly the Quechuas and the Aymaras), in the name of a "public health plan", presented on July 28, 1995. The plan was principally financed using funds from USAID (36 million dollars), the Nippon Foundation, and later, the United Nations Population Fund (UNFPA). On September 9, 1995, Fujimori presented a Bill that would revise the "General Law of Population", in order to allow sterilization. Several contraceptive methods were also legalized, all measures that were strongly opposed by the Roman Catholic Church, as well as the Catholic organization Opus Dei. In February 1996, the World Health Organization (WHO) itself congratulated Fujimori on his success in controlling demographic growth.

On February 25, 1998, a representative for USAID testified before the U.S. government's House Committee on International Relations, to address controversy surrounding Peru's program. He indicated that the government of Peru was making important changes to the program, in order to:

 Discontinue their campaigns in tubal ligations and vasectomies.
 Make clear to health workers that there are no provider targets for voluntary surgical contraception or any other method of contraception.
 Implement a comprehensive monitoring program to ensure compliance with family planning norms and informed consent procedures.
 Welcome Ombudsman Office investigations of complaints received and respond to any additional complaints that are submitted as a result of the public request for any additional concerns.
 Implement a 72-hour "waiting period" for people who choose tubal ligation or vasectomy. This waiting period will occur between the second counseling session and surgery.
 Require health facilities to be certified as appropriate for performing surgical contraception as a means to ensure that no operations are done in makeshift or substandard facilities.

In September 2001, Minister of Health Luis Solari launched a special commission into the activities of the voluntary surgical contraception, initiating a parliamentary commission tasked with inquiring into the "irregularities" of the program, and to put it on an acceptable footing. In July 2002, its final report ordered by the Minister of Health revealed that between 1995 and 2000, 331,600 women were sterilized, while 25,590 men submitted to vasectomies. The plan, which had the objective of diminishing the number of births in areas of poverty within Peru, was essentially directed at the indigenous people living in deprived areas (areas often involved in internal conflicts with the Peruvian government, as with the Shining Path guerilla group). Deputy Dora Núñez Dávila made the accusation in September 2003 that 400,000 indigenous people were sterilized during the 1990s. Documents proved that President Fujimori was informed, each month, of the number of sterilizations done, by his former Ministers of Health, Eduardo Yong Motta (1994–96), Marino Costa Bauer (1996–1999) and Alejandro Aguinaga (1999–2000). A study by sociologist , Nada Personal (in English: Nothing Personal), showed that doctors were required to meet quotas. According to Le Monde diplomatique, "tubal ligation festivals" were organized through program publicity campaigns, held in the pueblos jóvenes (in English: shantytowns). In 1996 there were, according to official statistics, 81,762 tubal ligations performed on women, with a peak being reached the following year, with 109,689 ligatures, then only 25,995 in 1998.

On October 21, 2011, Peru's Attorney General José Bardales decided to reopen an investigation into the cases, which had been halted in 2009 under the statute of limitations, after the Inter-American Commission on Human Rights ruled that President Fujimori's sterilization program involved crimes against humanity, which are not time-limited. It is unclear as to any progress in matter of the execution (debido ejecución sumaria) of the suspect in the course of any proof of their relevant accusations in the legal sphere of the constituted people in vindication of the rights of the people of South America. It may carry a parallel to any suspect cases for international investigation in any other continent, and be in the sphere of medical genocide. As of December 12, 2021:

South Africa
In South Africa, there have been multiple reports of HIV-positive women sterilized without their informed consent and sometimes without their knowledge. The Commission for Gender Equality investigated 48 sterilizations that were performed in fifteen state hospitals without patient consent from 2002 to 2005. This investigation into these hospitals revealed that medical providers threatened to not assist women during birth if they did not sign consent forms to being sterilized. In most cases these forms were not explained to patients by medical personnel. However, the inquiry was hampered by hostile hospital staff and the sudden "disappearance" of patient files. An interview with one of these patients revealed that she did not learn that she had been sterilized during her C-section until a physician told her eleven years after that she had no uterus. She went to the hospital were the surgery was performed and was told by a physician that it was done to save her life and consent was received from her mother. The patient did not have HIV or any other life-threatening condition, and her mother had not consented to the removal of her uterus. The report from the Commission for Gender Equality noted that some of the patients interviewed were given consent forms that they did not understand and were coerced to sign. The bulk of these operations were performed to prevent women who are HIV-positive from having more children. The HIV epidemic in South Africa has a prevalence of 13% and has largely affected the family structures in the country. Medical staff of these hospitals have justified their actions as an effort to stop the growing HIV numbers in the country that exhaust the healthcare systems. The Commission urged Health Minister Zweli Mkhize to take action against these state hospitals and to provide some form of redress to the many affected women.

Sweden

The eugenics program in Sweden was enacted in 1934 and was formally abolished in 1976. According to the 2000 governmental report, 21,000 were estimated to have been forcibly sterilized, 6,000 were coerced into a 'voluntary' sterilization while the nature of a further 4,000 cases could not be determined. Of those sterilized 93% were women. The reasons given for these sterilizations included mental slowness, racial differences, antisocial behavior, promiscuous behavior, and other behaviors deemed inappropriate. At the time, the government saw itself as a forward-thinking and enlightened welfare state. The Swedish state subsequently formed a commission of inquiry to determine victims that could claim compensation for trauma at the hands of the state. The sterilization program ended in the government paying over $22,000 in compensation to victims.

Until late 2012, Sweden implemented a law forcing transgender individuals to be sterilized before having their legal documents updated. After the law was repealed, those who were forcibly sterilized under the law began to demand compensation. In 2017, the government announced that it will pay these compensations. However, that does not change the fact that Sweden will not allow the change of gender on legal documents without the person in question going on to hormones, yet leaving it to the individual to pay for any egg or sperm freezing, this is still extremely problematic as:

United States 

During the Progressive Era ( to 1920), the United States was the first country to concertedly undertake compulsory sterilization programs for the purpose of eugenics. Thomas C. Leonard, professor at Princeton University, describes American eugenics and sterilization as ultimately rooted in economic arguments and further as a central element of Progressivism alongside wage controls, restricted immigration, and the introduction of pension programs. The heads of the programs were avid proponents of eugenics and frequently argued for their programs which achieved some success nationwide mainly in the first half of the 20th century.

Eugenics had two essential components. First, its advocates accepted as axiomatic that a range of mental and physical handicaps—blindness, deafness, and many forms of mental illness—were largely, if not entirely, hereditary in cause. Second, they assumed that these scientific hypotheses could be used as the basis of social engineering across several policy areas, including family planning, education, and immigration. The most direct policy implications of eugenic thought were that "mental defectives" should not produce children, since they would only replicate these deficiencies, and that such individuals from other countries should be kept out of the polity. The principal targets of the American sterilization programs were intellectually disabled people and the mentally ill, but also targeted under many state laws were the deaf, the blind, people with epilepsy, and the physically deformed. While the claim was that the focus was mainly the mentally ill and disabled, the definition of this during that time was much different from today's. At this time, there were many women that were sent to institutions under the guise of being "feeble-minded" because they were promiscuous or became pregnant while unmarried.

A relative minority of sterilizations targeting crime took place in prisons and other penal institutions. In the end, over 65,000 individuals were sterilized in 33 states under state compulsory sterilization programs in the United States, in all likelihood without the perspectives of ethnic minorities.

The first state to introduce a compulsory sterilization bill was Michigan, in 1897, but the proposed law failed to pass. Eight years later Pennsylvania's state legislators passed a sterilization bill that was vetoed by the governor. Indiana became the first state to enact sterilization legislation in 1907, followed closely by California and Washington in 1909. Several other states followed, but such legislation remained controversial enough to be defeated in some cases, as in Wyoming in 1934. In the 1920s, Eugenicists were particularly interested in black women in the South and Latina women in the Southwest in order to break the chain of welfare dependency and curb the population rise of non-white citizens.

After World War II, public opinion towards eugenics and sterilization programs became more negative in the light of the connection with the genocidal policies of Nazi Germany, though a significant number of sterilizations continued in a few states through the 1970s. Between 1970 and 1976, Indian Health Services sterilized between 25 and 42 percent of women of reproductive age who came in seeking healthcare services. In California, ten women who delivered their children at LAC-USC hospital between 1971-1974 and were sterilized without proper consent sued the hospital in the landmark Madrigal v. Quilligan case in 1975. The plaintiffs lost the case, but numerous changes to the consent process were made following the ruling, such as offering consent forms in the patient's native language, and a 72-hour waiting period between giving consent and undergoing the procedure.

The Oregon Board of Eugenics, later renamed the Board of Social Protection, existed until 1983, with the last forcible sterilization occurring in 1981. The U.S. commonwealth of Puerto Rico had a sterilization program as well. Some states continued to have sterilization laws on the books for much longer after that, though they were rarely if ever used. California sterilized more than any other state by a wide margin, and was responsible for over a third of all sterilization operations. Information about the California sterilization program was produced into book form and widely disseminated by eugenicists E. S. Gosney and Paul Popenoe, which was said by the government of Adolf Hitler to be of key importance in proving that large-scale compulsory sterilization programs were feasible.
In recent years, the governors of many states have made public apologies for their past programs beginning with Virginia and followed by Oregon and California. Few have offered to compensate those sterilized, however, citing that few are likely still living (and would of course have no affected offspring) and that inadequate records remain by which to verify them. At least one compensation case, Poe v. Lynchburg Training School & Hospital (1981), was filed in the courts on the grounds that the sterilization law was unconstitutional. It was rejected because the law was no longer in effect at the time of the filing. However, the petitioners were granted some compensation because the stipulations of the law itself, which required informing the patients about their operations, had not been carried out in many cases.

The 27 states where sterilization laws remained on the books (though not all were still in use) in 1956 were: Arizona, California, Connecticut, Delaware, Georgia, Idaho, Indiana, Iowa, Kansas, Maine, Michigan, Minnesota, Mississippi, Montana, Nebraska, New Hampshire, North Carolina, North Dakota, Oklahoma, Oregon, South Carolina, South Dakota, Utah, Vermont, Virginia, Washington, West Virginia and Wisconsin. Some states still have forced sterilization laws in effect, such as Washington state.

As of January 2011, discussions were under way regarding compensation for the victims of forced sterilization under the authorization of the Eugenics Board of North Carolina. Governor Bev Perdue formed the NC Justice for Sterilization Victims Foundation in 2010 in order "to provide justice and compensate victims who were forcibly sterilized by the State of North Carolina". In 2013 North Carolina announced that it would spend $10 million beginning in June 2015 to compensate men and women who were sterilized in the state's eugenics program; North Carolina sterilized 7,600 people from 1929 to 1974 who were deemed socially or mentally unfit.

The inability to pay for the cost of raising children has been a reason courts have ordered coercive or compulsory sterilization. In June 2014, a Virginia judge ruled that a man on probation for child endangerment must be able to pay for his seven children before having more children; the man agreed to get a vasectomy as part of his plea deal. In 2013, an Ohio judge ordered a man owing nearly $100,000 in unpaid child support to "make all reasonable efforts to avoid impregnating a woman" as a condition of his probation. Kevin Maillard wrote that conditioning the right to reproduction on meeting child support obligations amounts to "constructive sterilization" for men unlikely to make the payments. Of the 7600 people who were sterilized in North Carolina between 1929 and 1974, Elaine Riddick, a Black woman, was sterilized after giving birth to her son. Elaine Riddick was a survivor of rape, and in the United States, she was one of the many that were considered not worthy enough for reproductive, which is why she was sterilized. Riddick did not know she was sterilized until after she got married, and Elaine and her husband wanted to grow their family. After finding out that she was also a victim of compulsory sterilization, Riddick's attorney stated that one reason behind compulsory sterilization was that they did not want the less fortunate, disabled people or those who came from a background of criminal behavior to have children. Riddick did file a lawsuit against the state of North Carolina. Riddick did not win because the jury felt that her sterilization was not done against her will. The governor stated that the compensation was out of their budget range.

John Railey of the Winston-Salem Journal believed that this was devastating of the decision that was made. He believes that compensation was a way for sorrow. Many other people received compensation for many different reasons, which was so different for Riddick and others sterilized against their will.

As of July 19, 2021 it was reported that:

Georgia immigration detention center 2020 
In Georgia there was a sudden spike within the United States in 2020. Reports show that illegal hysterectomies were performed in Georgia on immigrants at U.S. Immigration and Customs Enforcement's Irwin County center. The physicians who performed the unnecessary hysterectomies believe that they do not have as much knowledge or authority over themselves due to the women being immigrants. The woman who remained anonymous claimed that she complained to officials at the Irwin County center that the physician Mahendra Amin was performing nonconsensual and invasive procedures. Despite him denying the allegations against himself, his case is still an ongoing federal investigation. After continuing the investigation, one of the nurses named Dawn Wooten came out saying that she felt that this same physician was performing involuntary sterilization. This called for an independent team of medical experts plus nine board-certified OB's to review more than 3,200 pages of medical records from 19 women that had unnecessary hysterectomies performed on them. Afterward, they found a pattern of misdiagnosing and failure to secure informed consent for surgery and other procedures. Nothing has been done for the women who have been forcibly sterilized, but one woman stated that she hopes President Joe Biden will do something about these illegally performed hysterectomies.In 2020, multiple human rights groups joined a whistleblower to accuse a privately owned U.S. immigration detention centre in Georgia of forcibly sterilizing women. The reports claimed a doctor conducted unauthorized medical procedures on women detained by Immigration and Customs Enforcement. The whistleblower, Dawn Wooten, was a nurse and former employee. She claims a high rate of sterilizations were performed on Spanish-speaking women and women who spoke various Indigenous languages common in Latin America. Wooten said the centre did not obtain proper consent for these surgeries, or lied to women about the medical procedures. More than 40 women submitted testimony in writing to document these abuses.

In September 2020, Mexico demanded more information from US authorities on medical procedures performed on migrants in detention centers, after allegations that six Mexican women were sterilized without their consent. The ministry said consulate personnel had interviewed 18 Mexican women who were detained at the center, none of whom "claimed to have undergone a hysterectomy". Another women said she had undergone a gynecological operation, although there was nothing in her detention file to support she agreed to the procedure.

Effect on disabled persons 
As stated previously, eugenics in the United States spread to target mentally disabled persons. Sterilization rates across the country were relatively low, with the sole exception of California, until the 1927 U.S. Supreme Court decision in Buck v. Bell, which upheld under the U.S. Constitution the forced sterilization of patients at a Virginia home for intellectually disabled people. In the wake of that decision, over 62,000 people in the United States, most of them women, were sterilized. The number of sterilizations performed per year increased until another Supreme Court case, Skinner v. Oklahoma, 1942, complicated the legal situation by ruling against sterilization of criminals if the equal protection clause of the constitution was violated. That is, if sterilization was to be performed, then it could not exempt white-collar criminals. This case however, does not directly overturn the decision made in Buck v. Bell. Instead, it invalidates the central argument of the decision, and has been used in several cases to deny guardians the right to sterilize the disabled person under their care.

The Congress of Obstetricians and Gynecologists (ACOG) believes that mental disability is not a reason to deny sterilization. The opinion of ACOG is that "the physician must consult with the patient's family, agents, and other caregivers" if sterilization is desired for a mentally limited patient. In 2003, Douglas Diekema wrote in Volume 9 of the journal Mental Retardation and Developmental Disabilities Research Reviews that "involuntary sterilization ought not be performed on mentally retarded persons who retain the capacity for reproductive decision-making, the ability to raise a child, or the capacity to provide valid consent to marriage." The Journal of Medical Ethics claimed, in a 1999 article, that doctors are regularly confronted with request to sterilize mentally limited people who cannot give consent for themselves. The article recommend that sterilization should only occur when there is a "situation of necessity" and the "benefits of sterilization outweigh the drawbacks."

The American Journal of Bioethics published an article, in 2010, that concluded the interventions used in the Ashley treatment may benefit future patients. These interventions, at the request of the parents and guidance from the physicians, included a hysterectomy and surgical removal of the breast buds of the mentally and physically disabled child. Proponents of the treatments argue that it protects disabled persons from sexual assault, unwanted pregnancy, and difficulties of menstruation. The interventions are still legal in many states, despite the argument that it violates a person's constitutional right to avoid unwanted intrusions. Discussion on the involuntary sterilization of disabled persons is now largely focused on the right of a guardian to request sterilization.

Criminal justice system 

In addition to eugenics purposes, sterilization was used as punitive tactic against sex offenders, people identified as homosexual, or people deemed to masturbate too much. California, the first state in the U.S. to enact compulsory sterilization based on eugenics, sterilized all prison inmates under the 1909 sterilization law. In the last 40 years, judges have offered lighter punishment (i.e. probation instead of jail sentence) to people willing to use contraception or be sterilized, particularly in child abuse/endangerment cases. One of the most famous cases of this was People v. Darlene Johnson, during which Johnson, a woman charged with child abuse sentenced to seven years in prison, was offered probation and a reduced prison sentence if she agreed to use Norplant.

In addition to child abuse cases, some politicians proposed bills mandating Norplant use among women on public assistance as a requirement to maintain welfare benefits. As noted above, some judges offered probation in lieu of prison time to women who agreed to use Norplant, while other court cases have ordered parents to cease childbearing until regaining custody of their children after abuse cases. Some legal scholars and ethicists argue such practices are inherently coercive. Furthermore, such scholars link these practices to eugenic policies of the 19th and early 20th century, highlighting how such practices not only targeted poor people, but disproportionately impacted minority women and families in the U.S., particularly black women.

In the late 1970s, to acknowledge the history of forced and coercive sterilizations and prevent ongoing eugenics/population control efforts, the federal government implemented a standardized informed consent process and specific eligibility criteria for government funded sterilization procedures. Some scholars argue the extensive consent process and 30-day waiting period go beyond preventing instances of coercion and serve as a barrier to desired sterilization for women relying on public insurance.

Though formal eugenics laws are no longer routinely implemented have been removed from government documents, instances of reproductive coercion still take place in U.S. institutions today. In 2011, investigative news released a report revealing that between 2006 and 2011, 148 female prisoners in two California state prisons were sterilized without adequate informed consent. In September 2014, California enacted Bill SB 1135 that bans sterilization in correctional facilities, unless the procedure shall be required in a medical emergency to preserve inmate's life.

Puerto Rico

Puerto Rican physician Dr. Lanauze Rolón founded the League for Birth Control in Ponce, Puerto Rico, in 1925, but the League was quickly squashed by opposition from the Catholic church. A similar League was founded seven years later, in 1932, in San Juan and continued in operation for two years before opposition and lack of support forced its closure. Yet another effort at establishing birth control clinics was made in 1934 by the Federal Emergency Relief Administration in a relief response to the conditions of the Great Depression. As a part of this effort, 68 birth control clinics were opened on the island. The next mass opening of clinics occurred in January 1937 when American Dr. Clarence Gamble, in association with a group of wealthy and influential Puerto Ricans, organized the Maternal and Infant Health Association and opened 22 birth control clinics.

The Governor of Puerto Rico, Blanton Winship, enacted Law 116, which went into effect on May 13, 1937. It was a birth control and eugenic sterilization law that allowed the dissemination of information regarding birth control methods and legalized the practice of birth control. The government cited a growing population of the poor and unemployed as motivators for the law. Changers were made to the Penal Code in 1937 which made abortion effectively legal. It was allowed for health reasons, without specifying details in the law. This gave doctors discretion to interpret what constituted a health reason, effectively legalizing abortion. By 1965, approximately 34 percent of women of childbearing age had been sterilized, two thirds of whom were still in their early twenties. The law was repealed on June 8, 1960.

1940s–1950s

Unemployment and widespread poverty would continue to grow in Puerto Rico in the 40s, both threatening U.S. private investment in Puerto Rico and acting as a deterrent for future investment. In an attempt to attract additional U.S. private investment in Puerto Rico, another round of liberalizing trade policies were implemented and referred to as "Operation Bootstrap." Despite these policies and their relative success, unemployment and poverty in Puerto Rico remained high, high enough to prompt an increase in emigration from Puerto Rico to the United States between 1950 and 1955. The issues of immigration, Puerto Rican poverty, and threats to U.S. private investment made population control concerns a prime political and social issue for the United States.

The 50s also saw the production of social science research supporting sterilization procedures in Puerto Rico. Princeton's Office of Population Research, in collaboration with the Social Research Department at the University of Puerto Rico, conducted interviews with couples regarding sterilization and other birth control. Their studies concluded that there was a significant need and desire for permanent birth control among Puerto Ricans. In response, Puerto Rico's governor and Commissioner of health opened 160 private, temporary birth control clinics with the specific purpose of sterilization.

Also during this era, private birth control clinics were established in Puerto Rico with funds provided by wealthy Americans. Joseph Sunnen, a wealthy American Republican and industrialist, established the Sunnen Foundation in 1957. The foundation funded new birth control clinics under the title "La Asociación Puertorriqueña el Biensestar de la Familia" and spent hundreds of thousands of dollars in an experimental project to determine if a formulaic program could be used to control population growth in Puerto Rico and beyond.

Sterilization procedures and coercion
From beginning of the 1900s, U.S. and Puerto Rican governments espoused rhetoric connecting the poverty of Puerto Rico with overpopulation and the "hyper-fertility" of Puerto Ricans. Such rhetoric combined with eugenics ideology of reducing "population growth among a particular class or ethnic group because they are considered...a social burden," was the philosophical basis for the 1937 birth control legislation enacted in Puerto Rico. A Puerto Rican Eugenics Board, modeled after a similar board in the United States, was created as part of the bill, and officially ordered ninety-seven involuntary sterilizations.

The legalization of sterilization was followed by a steady increase in the popularity of the procedure, both among the Puerto Rican population and among physicians working in Puerto Rico. Though sterilization could be performed on men and women, women were most likely to undergo the procedure. Sterilization was most frequently recommended by physicians because of a pervasive belief that Puerto Ricans and the poor were not intelligent enough to use other forms of contraception. Physicians and hospitals alike also implemented hospital policy to encourage sterilization, with some hospitals refusing to admit healthy pregnant women for delivery unless they consented to be sterilized. This has been best documented at Presbyterian Hospital, where the unofficial policy for a time was to refuse admittance for delivery to women who already had three living children unless she consented to sterilization. There is additional evidence that true informed consent was not obtained from patients before they underwent sterilization, if consent was solicited at all.

By 1949 a survey of Puerto Rican women found that 21% of women interviewed had been sterilized, with sterilizations being performed in 18% of all hospital births statewide as a routine post-partum procedure, with the sterilization operation performed before women left the hospitals after giving birth. As for the birth control clinics founded by Sunnen, the Puerto Rican Family Planning Association reported that around 8,000 women and 3,000 men had been sterilized in Sunnen's privately funded clinics. At one point, the levels of sterilization in Puerto Rico were so high that they alarmed the Joint Committee for Hospital Accreditation, who then demanded that Puerto Rican hospitals limit sterilizations to ten percent of all hospital deliveries in order to receive accreditation. The high popularity of sterilization continued into the 60s and 70s, during which the Puerto Rican government made the procedures available for free and reduced fees. The effects of the sterilization and contraception campaigns of the 1900s in Puerto Rico are still felt in Puerto Rican cultural history today.

Controversy and opposing viewpoints
There has been much debate and scholarly analysis concerning the legitimacy of choice given to Puerto Rican women with regards to sterilization, reproduction, and birth control, as well as with the ethics of economically motivated mass sterilization programs.

Some scholars, such as Bonnie Mass and Iris Lopez, have argued that the history and popularity of mass sterilization in Puerto Rico represents a government-led eugenics initiative for population control. They cite the private and government funding of sterilization, coercive practices, and the eugenics ideology of Puerto Rican and American governments and physicians as evidence of a mass sterilization campaign.

On the other side of the debate, scholars like Laura Briggs have argued that evidence does not substantiate claims of a mass sterilization program. She further argues that reducing the popularity of sterilization in Puerto Rico to a state initiative ignores the legacy of Puerto Rican feminist activism in favor or birth control legalization and the individual agency of Puerto Rican women in making decisions about family planning.

Effects
When the United States took census of Puerto Rico in 1899, the birth rate was 40 births per one thousand people. By 1961, the birth rate had dropped to 30.8 per thousand. In 1955, 16.5% of Puerto Rican women of childbearing age had been sterilized, this jumped to 34% in 1965.

In 1969, sociologist Harriet Presser analyzed the 1965 Master Sample Survey of Health and Welfare in Puerto Rico. She specifically analyzed data from the survey for women ages 20 to 49 who had at least one birth, resulting in an overall sample size of 1,071 women. She found that over 34% of women aged 20–49 had been sterilized in Puerto Rico in 1965.

Presser's analysis also found that 46.7% of women who reported they were sterilized were between the ages of 34 and 39. Of the sample of women sterilized, 46.6% had been married 15 to 19 years, 43.9% had been married for 10-to-14 years, and 42.7% had been married for 20-to-24 years. Nearly 50% of women sterilized had three or four births. Over 1/3 of women who reported being sterilized were sterilized in their twenties, with the average age of sterilization being 26.

A survey by a team of Americans in 1975 confirmed Presser's assessment that nearly 1/3 of Puerto Rican women of childbearing age had been sterilized. As of 1977, Puerto Rico had the highest proportion of childbearing-aged persons sterilized in the world. In 1993, ethnographic work done in New York by anthropologist Iris Lopez showed that the history of sterilization continued to effect the lives of Puerto Rican women even after they immigrated to the United States and lived there for generations. The history of the popularity of sterilization in Puerto Rico meant that Puerto Rican women living in America had high rates of female family members who had undergone sterilization, and it remained a highly popular form of birth control among Puerto Rican women living in New York.

Uzbekistan
According to reports, forced and coerced sterilization are current Government policy in Uzbekistan for women with two or three children as a means of forcing population control and to improve maternal mortality rates. In November 2007, a report by the United Nations Committee Against Torture reported that "the large number of cases of forced sterilization and removal of reproductive organs of women at reproductive age after their first or second pregnancy indicate that the Uzbek government is trying to control the birth rate in the country" and noted that such actions were not against the national Criminal Code in response to which the Uzbek delegation to the associated conference was "puzzled by the suggestion of forced sterilization, and could not see how this could be enforced."

Reports of forced sterilizations, hysterectomies and IUD insertions first emerged in 2005, although it is reported that the practice originated in the late 1990s, with reports of a secret decree dating from 2000. The current policy was allegedly instituted by Islam Karimov under Presidential Decree PP-1096, "on additional measures to protect the health of the mother and child, the formation of a healthy generation" which came into force in 2009. In 2005, Deputy Health Minister Assomidin Ismoilov confirmed that doctors in Uzbekistan were being held responsible for increased birth rates.

Based on a report by journalist Natalia Antelava, doctors reported that the Ministry of Health told doctors they must perform surgical sterilizations on women. One doctor reported, "It's ruling number 1098 and it says that after two children, in some areas after three, a woman should be sterilized.", in a loss of the former surface decency of Central Asian mores in regard of female chastity. In 2010, the Ministry of Health passed a decree stating all clinics in Uzbekistan should have sterilization equipment ready for use. The same report also states that sterilization is to be done on a voluntary basis with the informed consent of the patient. In the 2010 Human Rights Report of Uzbekistan, there were many reports of forced sterilization of women along with allegations of the government pressuring doctors to sterilize women in order to control the population. Doctors also reported to Antelava that there are quotas they must reach every month on how many women they need to sterilize. These orders are passed on to them through their bosses and, allegedly, from the government.

On May 15, 2012, during a meeting with the Russian president Vladimir Putin in Moscow the Uzbek president Islam Karimov said: "we are doing everything in our hands to make sure that the population growth rate [in Uzbekistan] does not exceed 1.2–1.3" The Uzbek version of RFE/RL reported that with this statement Karimov indirectly admitted that forced sterilization of women is indeed taking place in Uzbekistan. The main Uzbek television channel, O'zbekiston, cut out Karimov's statement about the population growth rate while broadcasting his conversation with Putin.
It is unclear if there is any genocidal conspiracy in regard of the Mongol type involved, in connection with genetic drain of this type through lack of their reproduction.

Despite international agreement concerning the inhumanity and illegality of forced sterilization, it has been suggested that the Government of Uzbekistan continues to pursue such programs.

Other countries
Eugenics programs including forced sterilization existed in most Northern European countries, as well as other more or less Protestant countries. Other countries that had notably active sterilisation programmes include Denmark ("that country's forced sterilization of 60,000 people in 1935-76"), Norway, Finland("In Finland, to change one's gender markers in the juridical system (also known as gender recognition), trans people are, still, forcibly sterilised. In the laws regarding gender recognition, this requirement is called the 'inability to reproduce', a choice of words that makes it sound a lot less threatening than 'forced sterilisation'"), Estonia, Switzerland, Iceland, and some countries in Latin America (including Panama).

In the United Kingdom, Home Secretary Winston Churchill was a noted advocate, and his successor Reginald McKenna introduced a bill that included forced sterilisation. Writer G. K. Chesterton led a successful effort to defeat that clause of the 1913 Mental Deficiency Act.

In one specific case in 2015, the Court of Protection of the United Kingdom ruled that a woman with six children and an IQ of 70 should be sterilized for her own safety because another pregnancy would have been a "significantly life-threatening event" for her and the fetus and was not relegated to eugenics.

See also

 Outline of Genocide studies
Birth control
Chemical castration
Christian views on contraception
Eugenics
Eugenics in the United States
History of eugenics
Forced pregnancy
Germany Must Perish!
Human overpopulation
La Operación
Medical law
Religion and birth control
Reproductive rights
Yogyakarta Principles

References

Further reading 

 
 Back, K., R. Hill and J.M. Stycos. "The Puerto Rican Field Experience in Population Control." Human Relations (1956):315–334.
 
 
 
 
 
 Manitoba Law Reform Commission. Discussion Paper on Sterilization of Minors and Mentally Incompetent Adults. Winnipeg: 1990.
 Manitoba Law Reform Commission. Report on Sterilization and Legal Incompetence. Winnipeg: 1993.
 McLaren, Angus. Our Own Master Race: Eugenics in Canada, 1885–1945. Toronto: McClelland & Stewart, 1990.
 

 
 "Nine women sterilized in B.C. have lawsuits settled for $450,000". The Vancouver Sun'. December 21, 2005.

External links
Forced Sterilization
"Three Generations, No Imbeciles: Virginia, Eugenics, and Buck v. Bell" (USA)Link doesn't work. Perhaps this next one is appropriate?
"Three Generations, No Imbeciles: Virginia, Eugenics, and Buck v. Bell" (USA)
Eugenics Archive (USA)
"Deadly Medicine: Creating the Master Race" (United States Holocaust Memorial Museum exhibit) (Germany, USA)
Eugenics – A Psychiatric Responsibility (History of Eugenics in Germany)
"Sterilization Law in Germany" (includes text of 1933 German law in appendix)
"Genocide in Tibet – Children of Despair"(NGO Group for the Convention on the Rights of the Child)
"Buck v. Bell (1927)" by N. Antonios and C. Raup at the Embryo Project Encyclopedia 

Compulsory sterilization
Birth control
Disability in law
Eugenics
History of psychiatry
Penology
Punishments
Reproductive rights
Sterilization (medicine)
Intersex and medicine
Social problems in medicine
Ethically disputed medical practices